David Lawson (born 22 December 1947 in Wallsend, England) is a former professional footballer who played as a goalkeeper during the 1960s, 1970s & 1980s.

References

1947 births
Living people
Sportspeople from Wallsend
Footballers from Tyne and Wear
English footballers
Association football goalkeepers
English Football League players
Newcastle United F.C. players
Bradford (Park Avenue) A.F.C. players
Huddersfield Town A.F.C. players
Everton F.C. players
Luton Town F.C. players
Stockport County F.C. players